Haj House  is a  complex in Lucknow in the Indian state of Uttar Pradesh. It provides accommodation  to the Haj bound Muslim people . Being the largest state of India, Uttar Pradesh has the maximum quota for haj pilgrims in India. Uttar Pradess Haj Committee  is situated in the Haj house, Lucknow.

Gallery

See also
Haj House (Mumbai)

References

Hajj pilgrimage from India
Buildings and structures in Lucknow
Government buildings in Uttar Pradesh